Onyekachi Paul Nwoha (born 28 February 1983 in Aba) is a Nigerian footballer who plays as a forward.

Club career
Onyekachi Nwoha began his career with FC Spiders, before he transferred to Enyimba International in 2001. He played for the Aba based team for one year before moving to League rival Enugu Rangers. In 2003, Nwoha was scouted by Tunisian top club Etoile Sahel. In Tunisia, he played one years before moving to Saudi Arabian United Al-Khaleej Club. In 2005, Nwoha moved to Arabic Emirates club Al Ain Club.

He transferred to Metalist Kharkiv in 2006.

From January to July 2008,he was loaned out to FC Zorya Luhansk. In summer 2008 he left Metalist Kharkiv and signed with Al Fujairah Sports Club in the UAE Division 1.

In February 2012, he left Bahrain to have a trial with the 2011 Malaysia Super League champions, Kelantan FA. Just two days after his arrival, he was offered a contract which he signed and officially unveiled as the new Kelantan import player. Nwoha made his debut on 14 February 2012 against Selangor FA. He was released from his contract in May 2012.

References

External links
 

1983 births
Living people
People from Aba, Abia
Nigerian footballers
Nigerian expatriate footballers
Nigerian expatriate sportspeople in the United Arab Emirates
FC Metalist Kharkiv players
Ukrainian Premier League players
Nigerian expatriate sportspeople in Tunisia
Nigerian expatriate sportspeople in Saudi Arabia
FC Zorya Luhansk players
Nigerian expatriate sportspeople in Ukraine
Nigerian expatriate sportspeople in Malaysia
Khaleej FC players
Al Ain FC players
Expatriate footballers in Ukraine
Enyimba F.C. players
Expatriate footballers in the United Arab Emirates
Étoile Sportive du Sahel players
Expatriate footballers in Tunisia
Rangers International F.C. players
UAE First Division League players
Saudi Professional League players
UAE Pro League players
Fujairah FC players
Association football forwards